Rotaovula is a genus of sea snails, marine gastropod mollusks in the family Ovulidae.

Species
Species within the genus Rotaovula include:
Rotaovula hirohitoi Cate & Azuma in Cate, 1973
Rotaovula septemmacula (Azuma, 1974)

References

Ovulidae